Lake Jasybay or Zhasybai is a lake in the Bayanaul Range, south-eastern Pavlodar Region, Kazakhstan.

It is a popular tourist destination for residents of central and northern Kazakhstan because of its clear water and scenic views from its beaches. The lake was formerly known as Shoyynkol (Шойынколь), but it was renamed after Jasybay, a mythic Kazakh hero who was killed in 1752 on its shore during a battle against invaders.

Geography

References

Lakes of Kazakhstan